The 1994–95 Kentucky Wildcats men's basketball team represented University of Kentucky. The head coach was  Rick Pitino. The team was a member of the Southeast Conference and played their home games at Rupp Arena.

Roster

Schedule

|-
!colspan=11 style="background:#EEEEEE;"| Exhibition

|-
!colspan=12 |Regular Season

|-
!colspan=12| 1995 SEC tournament

|-
!colspan=12| 1995 NCAA tournament (Tournament seeding in parentheses)

Rankings

Awards and honors

Team players drafted into the NBA
No one from the Wildcats was claimed in the 1995 NBA draft.

References

Kentucky
Kentucky
Kentucky Wildcats men's basketball seasons
Wild
Wild